The First Hundred Years is the first ongoing TV soap opera in the United States that began as a daytime serial, airing on CBS from December 4, 1950 until June 27, 1952. A previous daytime drama on NBC, These Are My Children, aired in 1949 but only lasted one month, and NBC's Hawkins Falls began in June 1950 as a primetime "soap" and didn't move to daytime until April 1951.

The show began with the wedding of Chris Thayer and Connie Martin, which lasted for the first week of episodes. The couple settled down in a huge, unkept white elephant mansion, a present from Connie's father.

The series did not succeed due to very low viewership, as few American households had television sets, and fewer still watched during the afternoon.

The series was replaced with the television version of Guiding Light, which would prove to be much more successful, airing for 57 years (72 years total when its 15-year run on radio is taken into account).

See also
Hubert Schlafly, invented the Teleprompter for this series

References

External links
 

American television soap operas
CBS original programming
1950 American television series debuts
1952 American television series endings
Television series by Procter & Gamble Productions
Black-and-white American television shows
English-language television shows
CBS network soap operas